The list of natural reservation of Suceava County includes protected areas of national interest (nature reserves), located in the administrative territory of Suceava County, Romania.

List of protected area

See also 
 Protected areas of Romania

References 

Suceava County, natural reservations
Suceava County
Natural reservations